Olympic Park railway station may refer to:

 Olympic Park railway station, Sydney, Australia
 Sydney Olympic Park metro station, a proposed metro station in Sydney, Australia
 Olympic Park station (Seoul), in Seoul, South Korea
 Imeretinsky Kurort railway station, formerly Olympic Park, in Sochi, Russia
 Aolinpike Gongyuan (Olympic Park) station, Beijing Subway, China

See also
Olympic Park (disambiguation)